South Hill is a neighborhood and historic district located immediately south of downtown Lexington, Kentucky, United States. Its boundaries are South Limestone Street to the east, Pine Street to the south, South Broadway to the west, and High Street to the north.

Neighborhood statistics
 Area: 
 Population: 466
 Population density: 5,916 people per square mile
 Median age: 26.9
 Median household income: $29,332

External links
 http://www.city-data.com/neighborhood/South-Hill-Lexington-KY.html

Neighborhoods in Lexington, Kentucky